Catalan myths and legends are the traditional myths and legends of the Catalan-speaking world, especially Catalonia itself, passed down for generations as part of that region's popular culture.

Mythological figures
Among the figures of Catalan mythology are:
Aloja - In Catalan mythology an Aloja, also known as Dona d'aigua, Goja, or Paitida, is a feminine being that lives in places with fresh water. This "water-woman" can turn into water blackbirds.
Banyoles monster
Bubota
Catalan mythology about witches - Catalan tradition distinguished between bruixeria ("witchcraft") based on an explicit compact with the Devil, and fetilleria (deriving from a word related to "fetish", and Old Portuguese feitiço), magic worked through charms and fetishes. The former was considered inherently evil, while the latter might include the working of magical cures. In Catalan popular culture, there are a large number of legends about witches. In the popular imagination, a witch is a woman who, by means of a pact with the Devil, has acquired supernatural power, which she uses for her own benefit and for evil purposes.
Carnestoltes
Cocollona
Comte Arnau
Comte Estruch
Cucafera
Dip - In Catalan myth, Dip is an evil, black, hairy dog, an emissary of the Devil, who sucks people's blood.
Dona d'aigua - (See Aloja)
Donyet
Dragons
Drac (a dragon, generally male)
Víbria (specifically female)
Encantaria
Follet
Gambutzí
Goja - (See Aloja)
Fada - Hada
Home del sac (man of the sack)
Home dels nassos (man of the noses)
Marraco
Martinet
Minairó
El Moro Musa
Muladona
Negret
Nitus
Paitida - (See Aloja)
Papu
Peix Nicolau - Peje Nicolao
Pellofa
Pesanta
Puigmal
Tió de Nadal
The Three Wise Men or Tres Reis Mags d'Orient
Page Gregory
Page Fumera
Tombatossals
Vella Quaresma
Víbria

Generic figures
In Catalonia those characters that are invoked to induce fear in children for practical purposes, for example to avoid speaking to strangers or leaving home alone, are called Espantamainades. At the anthropological level, sometimes they are manifestations of the fears of the unknown and inexplicable in nature. Some are local representations related to those figures also existing in other cultures, such as witches, goblins, and the bogeyman. Others are purely local variations, such as Marraco the peasant and the dips.

References

Catalan mythology